Psilocybe papuana is a species of mushroom in the family Hymenogastraceae.

It was described in 1978 from Papua New Guinea.   It is most frequently seen in New South Wales, Australia.

See also
List of Psilocybin mushrooms
Psilocybin mushrooms
Psilocybe

References

Entheogens
Psychoactive fungi
papuana
Psychedelic tryptamine carriers
Fungi of North America